Jokl is a Jewish surname, a diminutive of Jacob. Notable people with this name include:

 Karol Jokl (1945–1996), Slovak football player
 Norbert Jokl (1877 – probably May 1942), Austrian Albanologist of Jewish descent
 Roland Jokl (born 1962), Austrian athlete

References 

Jewish surnames